Forever Neverland is the second studio album by Danish singer and songwriter MØ. It was released on 19 October 2018 by Columbia Records. It is her first full-length release since her debut studio album No Mythologies to Follow (2014), and comes after her second EP When I Was Young (2017). The album was preceded by five singles: "Nostalgia", "Sun in Our Eyes" featuring Diplo, "Way Down", "Imaginary Friend" and "Blur". The album also features collaborations with Charli XCX, What So Not, Two Feet and Empress Of.

Background
A year after the release of her debut album, MØ announced that she is working on her new album. In April 2015, MØ released a draft of the song "Kamikaze" which was later authorized by Mads Kristiansen. Later MØ traveled to New York to reunite with American DJ Diplo, where he later produced the song. On 15 October 2015, MØ finally released her single "Kamikaze" and it has reached the top 40 in Belgium and Denmark.

MØ later traveled to Los Angeles to release a new song. She sent the lyrics to MNEK to produce the new song. On 13 May 2016, she released "Final Song", originally intended for her second album. "Final Song" reached the top 5 in Denmark, the top 20 in Australia, Norway and the United Kingdom, and the top 100 in Canada and Sweden.

Later she worked with Sophie, Benny Blanco and Cashmere Cat on "Nights with You", the planned third single of the album, which premiered on MistaJam's BBC Radio 1. It was released on 21 April 2017.

On 1 January 2018, MØ explained in an interview how her life has been changed after gaining international recognition for her collaboration with Major Lazer and DJ Snake on "Lean On". Later she once again collaborated with Major Lazer for "Cold Water", also featuring Canadian singer Justin Bieber. She also said that her EP When I Was Young is her first major release following the success of both Major Lazer's "Lean On" and "Cold Water". She admitted that the "new tracks might not be what new fans might expect following those two features and the others she's done since 2015, but that might not be such a bad thing". She has been working for four years on her new album, because after the success of "Lean On" and "Cold Water", MØ thought that she "needed to put out a little compilation of songs that [she has] done over the years that have felt very personal to [her]", before going into that second album phase.

On 12 July 2018, MØ teased her second album with the release of her new single "Sun in Our Eyes". On 7 September she revealed the album's cover and also that the album will be released on 19 October 2018. She also revealed that the other singles "Kamikaze", "Final Song" and "Nights with You" will only be available in the Japanese edition.

Singles
On 28 March 2018, MØ released the album's lead single "Nostalgia" for streaming and digital download. Later MØ released the official vertical music video on 3 May 2018 via YouTube.

On 12 July 2018, "Sun in Our Eyes" was released as the album's second single. The song peaked at number 17 on the Flemish Ultratop chart and at number 32 on New Zealand's Hot 40 Singles. The music video was released on 8 August 2018 on YouTube.

On 7 September 2018, "Way Down" was released as the album's third single.

On 21 September 2018, "Imaginary Friend" was released as the album's fourth single. The official music video was released on the same day.

"Blur" was released on 14 October 2018 as the album's fifth single.

Critical reception

At Metacritic, which assigns a weighted average score out of 100 to reviews from mainstream critics, the album received an average score of 69, based on 13 reviews, indicating "generally favorable reviews".

Writing for Pitchfork, Dani Blum wrote that the album's "tracklist here reads like a who's who of frat-party EDM: Diplo once again makes his mark, as does the former Flume appendage What So Not. [...] Most of the album dissolves into tingly club tracks with more texture than the average dancefloor hit." Blum summarised that most of the tracks on Forever Neverland are too "oversaturated and exhausting" with only occasional moments of "real shimmer". Neil Z. Yeung of AllMusic gave the album 3 out of 5 stars, saying, "Forever Neverland contains enough catchy moments to warrant a listen, but mostly remains fodder for de rigueur 2010s alt-pop playlists." Will Richards of DIY said, "there's nothing of the size or scale of 'Lean On', but in unapologetically treading her own path, MØ's beginning to carve a new identity all of her own." Harriet Willis of The Skinny called it "a masterpiece that puts MØ firmly on her own pedestal as an individual artist rather than a recurring feature." Malvika Padin of Clash commented that "while tracks like 'Beautiful Wreck' - springy, satisfying and by no means a misfit within this gripping offering - seems quite bland in comparison to the rest which boasts a bold sound, the album remains fascinating, never misses a beat and keeps you listening through to the end."

Sam Van Pykeren of Mother Jones named it the 6th best album of 2018. Mike Wass of Idolator placed it at number 8 on the "25 Best Albums of 2018" list. Billboard included it on the "20 Best Album Covers of 2018" list.

Tour 
MØ announced Forever Neverland World Tour on 23 April 2018. Tickets were on sale on 25 April 2018. First show from tour started in Hamburg on 9 November 2018 and last headline show was in Frementle on 9 April 2019 in Australia. Dates from 31 May to 5 October 2019 were Summer Tour but this tour also promoted her album Forever Neverland.

Cancelled shows

Track listing

Notes
  signifies a vocal producer
  signifies an executive producer
 All album vocal production work was handled by Erik Eger, Andy Steinway and Dillon Zachara, except where noted.

Charts

Certifications

References

2018 albums
MØ albums
Albums produced by Frank Dukes
Albums produced by Diplo
Albums produced by John Hill (record producer)
Albums produced by Stargate
Albums produced by Hudson Mohawke
Albums produced by Illangelo
Albums produced by MNEK
Albums produced by Benny Blanco
Albums produced by Cashmere Cat